The Virgin Mart (aka Fan Mai Ren Kou and Bo Ming de Ren) is a 1974 Hong Kong action film directed by actress-turned-director Kao Pao-shu.

The film—which stars Chin Hu, Eddy Ko, and Shih Kien—centers around young girls who are lured to Hong Kong and trapped in a prostitution ring. The film was rated "for mature audiences."

The film opened in China in 1974, and appeared in U.S. theaters with subtitles in 1976.

References

1974 films
Hong Kong action films
1974 action films
1970s Hong Kong films